The list of regions of Canada is a summary of geographical areas on a hierarchy that ranges from national (groups of provinces and territories) at the top to local regions and sub-regions of provinces at the bottom. Administrative regions that rank below a province and above a municipality are also included if they have a comprehensive range of functions compared to the limited functions of specialized government agencies. Some provinces and groups of provinces are also quasi-administrative regions at the federal level for purposes such as representation in the Senate of Canada.  However regional municipalities (or regional districts in British Columbia) are included with local municipalities in the article List of municipalities in Canada.

National regions
The provinces and territories are sometimes grouped into regions, listed here from west to east by province, followed by the three territories. Seats in the Senate are equally divided among four regions: the West, Ontario, Quebec, and the Maritimes, with special status for Newfoundland and Labrador as well as for the three territories of Northern Canada ('the North').  This is the only regional scheme that has any legal status or function. Regional representation on the Supreme Court of Canada is governed more by convention than by law. Quebec is the only region with a legally guaranteed quota of three judges on the bench. The other regions are usually represented by three judges from Ontario, two from Western Canada (typically but not formally one from British Columbia and one from the Prairie Provinces) and one from Atlantic Canada. The three territories do not have any separate representation on the Supreme Court.

Statistics Canada uses the six-region model for the Geographical Regions of Canada. Immigration, Refugees and Citizenship Canada uses the five-region model, while seven regions are commonly used for polling. The various models are derived from the three-region scheme by progressively subdividing the western and eastern regions (the northern region is the same for all models) into smaller and smaller units consisting of provinces or groups of provinces. If the models are not treated as mutually exclusive, eight distinct national regions can be identified when the three western regions of the seven region scheme are combined with the two Atlantic regions of the Senate method and the Ontario, Quebec, and Northern regions common to both schemes.

Inter-provincial regions
An inter-provincial region includes more than one province or territory but doesn't usually include the entirety of each province or territory in the group.  However, the geographic or cultural features that characterize this type of region can sometimes lead to the relevant provinces or territories being seen as regional groups like British Columbia-Yukon and Alberta-Northwest Territories.

Linguistic
French Canada, centred in Quebec but with scattered populations in Manitoba, Ontario, and the Maritimes that are increasingly part of...
The Bilingual Belt, a portion of Canada where both English and French are regularly spoken: Northeastern Ontario, Southeastern Ontario, the Ottawa Valley, the Island of Montreal, the Eastern Townships of Quebec and northern and eastern New Brunswick
English Canada, sometimes known as the Rest of Canada, with Quebec usually excluded despite the presence of scattered English speaking populations in the southern part of the province which are increasingly part of the Bilingual belt 
Inuit Nunangat, a large region of northern Canada populated mainly by the Inuit, the majority of whom do not claim either English or French as their first language

Primary, secondary, and local geographic

Arctic Archipelago, a large group of Canadian islands in the Arctic Ocean that lies partly in Nunavut, partly in the Northwest Territories, and one, Herschel Island, that is part of Yukon.
Arctic Cordillera, a very long, broken chain of mountain ranges extending along the northeastern flank of the Canadian Arctic Archipelago from Ellesmere Island to the northernmost part of the Labrador Peninsula in northern Labrador and northern Quebec
Canadian Cordillera which links most of British Columbia and Yukon with some smaller adjacent areas of Alberta and the Northwest Territories to form a single region of mountains and plateaus
Taiga Cordillera that includes much of Northern Yukon Territory and an adjacent area of the Northwest Territories
Boreal Cordillera that links northwestern British Columbia with Southern Yukon
Pacific Maritime Cordillera that includes the west coast of British Columbia and the southwest corner of Yukon
Montane Cordillera that includes the central and southern interior of British Columbia and the Rocky Mountains that extend partly into Alberta
Interior Plains of western Canada, which extend from the coast of the Arctic Ocean to the Canada-US border east of the Canadian Cordillera and west of the Canadian Shield; links the Mackenzie Valley with the Canadian prairie.
Southern Arctic Plains that includes the arctic coast of Yukon, the Northwest Territories, and an adjacent part of Nunavut
Taiga Plains that include parts of northeastern Yukon, the Northwest Territories, northeastern British Columbia, and northwestern Alberta
Boreal Plains, which links parts of northern British Columbia, Alberta, and Saskatchewan with part of Central Manitoba and a small part of the Northwest Territories
Peace River Country, a valley area of parkland and boreal plain that links parts of northern British Columbia and northern Alberta as a part of the larger Boreal Plains region
Aspen Parkland, a long but relatively narrow transitional region in the Prairie Provinces that separates the boreal forests of the north from the prairie grasslands further south
The Prairies, including the grasslands and the Palliser's Triangle that links the main agricultural regions of Alberta, Saskatchewan and Manitoba 
Cypress Hills that links the hilly areas of southern Alberta with their counterparts in southern Saskatchewan
Canadian Shield, a vast region centred around Hudson Bay that includes parts of every province except British Columbia and the Maritimes, and parts of every territory except Yukon
Northern Arctic Shield, includes the Boothia and Melville Peninsulas of Nunavut and the northwestern tip of Quebec.
Southern Arctic Shield, parts of the Canadian Shield separated by Hudson Bay and located mostly in Nunavut and the most northerly region of Quebec
Taiga Shield, parts of the Canadian Shield located west of Hudson Bay from the Northwest Territories  to the far northern fringe of the Prairie Provinces, and east of Hudson Bay and James Bay from Quebec to Labrador 
Boreal Shield, located mostly south of Hudson Bay and James Bay from northeastern Alberta to southeastern Labrador
Southern Boreal Shield, a transitional region in Central Ontario and the west-central part of Quebec that separates the boreal forests of the north from the mostly mixed-leaf forests further south
Hudson Bay Lowland, a large wetland that extends from northeastern Manitoba across the far north of Ontario into northwestern Quebec
Quebec City–Windsor Corridor that links Southern Ontario with Southern Quebec
St. Lawrence Lowlands, a low lying valley also known as the Mixedwood Plains extending from Quebec City to Windsor, Ontario, which is similar but not identical to the Corridor in geographic extent
Ottawa Valley that links Eastern Ontario with western Quebec, the southern part of which overlaps the Corridor and the Mixedwood Plains
Appalachian Mountains, an old, partly eroded system of mountain ranges, hills, and plateaus that extends into southeastern Canada from the eastern United States
Acadia, a largely historical region that links parts of the Maritimes and parts of eastern Quebec within the Appalachian region

Administrative
 National Capital Region, a federal administrative region that straddles the Ottawa River on the Ontario-Quebec border and includes the cities of Ottawa and Gatineau.

Provincial regions 
The provinces and territories are nearly all sub-divided into regions for a variety of official and unofficial purposes.  The geographic regions are largely unofficial and therefore somewhat open to interpretation. In some cases, the primary regions are separated by identifiable transition zones, particularly in Alberta, Saskatchewan, and Ontario. The largest provinces can be divided into a number of primary geographic regions of comparatively large size (e.g. southern Ontario), and subdivided into a greater number of smaller secondary regions (e.g. southwestern Ontario). The primary and secondary regions in Ontario are mainly non-administrative in nature.  However, they tend to be defined as geographic groupings of counties, regional municipalities, and territorial districts, so that the regions are defined by a system or collection of borders that have local administrative importance.

In other large provinces, the primary and secondary geographic regions are defined more strictly by topographical and ecological boundaries.  In geographically diverse provinces, the secondary regions can be further subdivided into numerous local regions and even sub-regions.  British Columbia has a much greater number of local regions and sub-regions than the other provinces and territories due to its mountainous terrain where almost every populated lake, sound, and river valley, and every populated cape and cluster of small islands  can claim a distinct geographical identity.  At the other extreme, Prince Edward Island is not divided into any widely recognized geographic regions or sub-regions because of its very small size and lack of large rivers or rugged terrain.  New Brunswick's small size renders it dividable into local geographic regions only.

Several provinces and territories also have supra-municipal administrative regions.  Their borders mostly do not harmonize with the geographic regions, so they are not considered subdivisions or groupings of the latter.

Alberta

Primary, secondary, and local geographic regions 

Northern Alberta (forests that lie mostly north of the North Saskatchewan River)
Alberta Taiga Plains
Alberta Taiga Shield
Alberta Boreal Plain
Peace River Country (Alberta portion)
Alberta Boreal Shield
Alberta Mountain forests
Southern Alberta (geographic)
Alberta Parkland
Alberta Prairie
Cypress Hills (Alberta portion)

Quasi-administrative or demographic regions 

These regions are not officially considered subdivisions of the larger primary natural regions.
Northern Alberta
Central Alberta
Calgary–Edmonton Corridor
Southern Alberta
Alberta's Rockies
Calgary Metropolitan Region
Edmonton Metropolitan Region

British Columbia

Primary, secondary, and local geographic regions and subregions 
British Columbia Interior
North Interior Taiga Plains
North Interior Boreal Plains/Peace River Country
North Interior Boreal Cordillera
Atlin District
Stikine Country
Central Interior Montane Cordillera
Nechako
Bulkley
Omineca–Prince George
Robson Valley
Cariboo
Interlakes
Fraser Canyon
Chilcotin
South Interior Montane Cordillera
Kootenays
West Kootenay
Kootenay Lake
Slocan
Arrow Lakes
East Kootenay
Elk Valley
Columbia Valley
Columbia Country
Big Bend Country
Okanagan
Boundary
Similkameen
Thompson
Nicola
Bonaparte
Wells Gray–Clearwater
Shuswap
Fraser Canyon (overlaps Lillooet Country)
Bridge River Country
Lower Mainland
Greater Vancouver
Fraser Valley
British Columbia Coast/Pacific Maritime Cordillera
South Coast
Sea-to-Sky Corridor
Lillooet Country (overlaps Frazer Canyon region and Sea-to-Sky corridor)
Pemberton Valley
Gates Valley
Sunshine Coast
Central Coast
Queen Charlotte Strait
Bella Coola Valley
North Coast
Haida Gwaii (formerly Queen Charlotte Islands)
Skeena
Nass
Stewart Country
Vancouver Island
South Island
Greater Victoria
Saanich Peninsula
Western Communities
Juan de Fuca region
South Central Island (included with an extended Central Island region for some administrative purposes)
Cowichan Valley 
Chemainus Valley
Central Island
East Central Island
East Central Coast (Ladysmith–Nanaimo–Parksville) 
Comox Valley
West Central Island
Nootka Sound
Clayoquot Sound
Barkley Sound
Alberni Valley
North Island
Northwest Island
Kyuquot Sound
Quatsino Sound
Cape Scott
Northeast Island
Queen Charlotte Strait
Johnstone Strait
Gulf Islands
Southern Gulf Islands
Northern Gulf Islands

Manitoba

Primary and secondary geographic regions 
Northern Manitoba (forests mostly north of the Saskatchewan River and east of Lake Winnipeg)
Hudson Bay Lowlands (Manitoba portion)
Manitoba Taiga Shield
Manitoba Boreal Shield.
Central Manitoba
Interlake (Manitoba Boreal Plain)
Manitoba Parkland
Southern Manitoba (eastern part of Palliser's Triangle)
Central Plains
Eastman
Westman
Winnipeg Capital Region (administrative)
Pembina Valley

New Brunswick

Geographic regions (No distinctions made between primary, secondary, or local)
Acadian Peninsula
North Shore
Fundy Isles
Miramichi Valley
Saint John Valley
Greater Shediac
Greater Moncton
Greater Saint John
Greater Fredericton

Newfoundland and Labrador

Primary, secondary, and local geographic regions 
Labrador
Labrador Arctic Cordillera
Labrador Taiga Shield
Labrador West
Nunatsiavut
Labrador Boreal Shield
Newfoundland
Avalon Peninsula
Burin Peninsula
Bonavista Peninsula
South Coast
West Coast
Bay of Islands
Bay St. George
Bay St. George South
Port au Port Peninsula
Great Northern Peninsula
Northeast Coast

Northwest Territories

Primary and secondary geographic regions 
Arctic Archipelago (N.W.T. portion)
N.W.T. Mainland
Southern Arctic Plains
Mackenzie Mountains
Taiga Plains
Taiga shield (N.W.T. portion)
Boreal Plains

Administrative regions  
Administrative regions of Northwest Territories.
Inuvik Region
Sahtu Region
Dehcho Region
North Slave Region
South Slave Region

Nova Scotia

Primary, secondary, and local geographic regions 
Mainland Nova Scotia
South Shore
Annapolis Valley
Eastern Shore
Strait of Canso Area
Musquodoboit Valley
North Shore
Cape Breton Island
Industrial Cape Breton
Cape Breton Highlands

Nunavut

Primary and secondary geographic regions 
Arctic Archipelago (Nunavut portion)
Arctic Cordillera (Nunavut portion)
Nunavut Mainland
Northern Arctic Shield
Southern Arctic Plains
Southern Arctic Shield
Nunavut Taiga Shield

Administrative regions 
Kitikmeot Region
Kivalliq Region
Qikiqtaaluk Region

Ontario

Primary, secondary, and local geographic regions  

Most geographic regions in Ontario defined by grouping counties and other administrative units

Northern Ontario (mostly boreal shield that lies north of the French River)
Northwestern Ontario
Northeastern Ontario
Southeastern Boreal Shield (Northeastern Ontario portion)
Hudson Bay Lowlands  
Southern Ontario
Central Ontario
Southeastern Boreal Shield (Central Ontario portion)
Thirty Thousand Islands
Muskoka Lakes area
St. Lawrence Lowlands/Mixedwood Plains  (Central Ontario portion)
Kawartha Lakes
Bay of Quinte
Eastern Ontario
National Capital Region
Southeastern Boreal Shield (Eastern Ontario portion)
Rideau Lakes area
Thousand Islands
St. Lawrence Lowlands/Mixedwood Plains (Eastern Ontario portion)
Golden Horseshoe
Greater Toronto and Hamilton Area
Niagara Peninsula
Southwestern Ontario
Georgian Triangle
Bruce Peninsula

Quasi-administrative regions 
Northern Ontario (territorial districts; a quasi-administrative region that extends south of the French River)
Greater Golden Horseshoe (a quasi-administrative region that extends beyond the geographic Golden Horseshoe)

Prince Edward Island 

Not subdivided into geographical regions or sub-regions

Quebec

Primary and secondary geographic regions 
Northern Quebec
Arctic Cordillera (Quebec portion)
Northern Arctic Shield (Quebec portion) 
Southern Arctic Shield (Quebec portion)
Quebec Taiga Shield 
Hudson Bay Lowlands (Quebec portion)
Quebec Boreal Shield
Southeastern Boreal Shield (Quebec portion)
Southern Quebec
St. Lawrence Lowlands North Shore (Quebec portion)
St. Lawrence Lowlands South Shore (including Montérégie)
Hochelaga Archipelago
Anticosti Island
Appalachian Mountains (Quebec portion)

Administrative regions 
Montérégie
Estrie
Montreal
Laval
Centre-du-Québec
Chaudière-Appalaches
Outaouais
Laurentides
Lanaudière
Mauricie
Capitale-Nationale
Bas-Saint-Laurent
Gaspésie–Îles-de-la-Madeleine
Abitibi-Témiscamingue
Saguenay–Lac-Saint-Jean
Côte-Nord (North Shore)
Nord-du-Québec (Northern Quebec)

Saskatchewan

Primary and secondary geographic regions 
Northern Saskatchewan (forests that lie mostly north of the North Saskatchewan River)
Saskatchewan Taiga Shield
Saskatchewan Boreal Shield
Saskatchewan Boreal Plain
Southern Saskatchewan
Saskatchewan Parkland
Saskatchewan Prairie Grassland
Cypress Hills (Saskatchewan portion)

Yukon

Primary, secondary, and local geographic regions 
Northern Yukon
Yukon Southern Arctic Coastal Plain
Yukon Taiga Cordillera
Yukon Taiga Plain
Southern Yukon
Yukon Boreal Cordillera
Klondike
Southern Lakes
Pacific Maritime Cordillera

See also

 Geography of Canada
 Census geographic units of Canada
 Numbered Treaties: Large parts of Western Canada, Northern Canada, and Northern Ontario are described by treaty numbers, such as "Treaty 8," based on a series of 11 treaties signed between the Crown and First Nations between 1871 and 1921

References

 
Regions of Canada
Regions of Canada